Dave Ritchie (born September 3, 1938) is a former gridiron football coach in college football, the Canadian Football League (CFL), the Italian Football League, and Switzerland Nationalliga A (American football). He is best known for his time as the Winnipeg Blue Bombers head coach from 1999 to 2004. He is a three-time Grey Cup champion, having won in 1990, 1994, and 2006 and was named the CFL's Coach of the Year in 2001. He won 108 regular season games as a head coach in the CFL which is the seventh highest win total by a head coach in the league's history.

College career
Ritchie played college football as a fullback, linebacker, and punter for the Cincinnati Bearcats from 1958 to 1960.

Coaching career

College coaching
Ritchie began his coaching career in 1962 as an assistant coach with Greenbrier Military School. He was an assistant coach with his alma mater, Cincinnati, from 1969 to 1972. He later joined the Brown Bears as an assistant coach and head recruiter. Thereafter, Ritchie was the head coach for the Fairmont State Fighting Falcons, from 1978 to 1982, where he compiled a 35–13–3 record.

Montreal Concordes / Alouettes
Ritchie first entered the Canadian Football League as the defensive backfield coach for the Montreal Concordes in 1983, alongside linebackers coach, Wally Buono. He continued in that role until 1987, when the renamed Alouettes folded just prior to the start of the regular season.

Interlude
Ritchie re-joined the Cincinnati Bearcats as an assistant coach in 1988. He then moved to Europe and was the defensive coordinator for the Milano Seamen in the Italian Football League in 1989 where the team finished with a 13–1 record and won the Italian championship.

Winnipeg Blue Bombers
Ritchie returned to the CFL as the defensive line coach and special teams assistant coach with the Winnipeg Blue Bombers in 1990, a year in which the Blue Bombers won the 78th Grey Cup. In 1991, he coached the defensive backs, but the Blue Bombers lost the East Final that year.

Ottawa Rough Riders
Ritchie was hired by the Ottawa Rough Riders to become the team's defensive coordinator for the 1992 season. The team led the CFL in 18 of 25 defensive categories that year and finished with a non-losing record for the first time since 1983.

BC Lions
In 1993, Ritchie was named the head coach of the BC Lions as he took over a team that had a 3–15 record in the year prior. The Lions immediately improved and finished with a 10–8 record that year, losing the West Semi-Final to the Calgary Stampeders. In the 1994 season, after beginning the year 8–1–1, the Lions finished in third place with an 11–6–1 record. The Lions defeated the Edmonton Eskimos and then the Calgary Stampeders in the playoffs to qualify for the 82nd Grey Cup against the Baltimore Football Club. In the first ever Grey Cup game to feature an American team, Ritchie led his team to a 26–23 victory as the Lions won a Grey Cup in Vancouver for the first time in club history and were also the first West Division team to win the Grey Cup at home. In 1995, the Lions ended their season with a 10–8 record, but were defeated by the Edmonton Eskimos in the North Semi-Final.

Montreal Alouettes (II)
Ritchie joined the Montreal Alouettes in 1996 in their return to the CFL as he was also on the coaching staff in 1987 when the Alouettes were last in the league. He was promoted to head coach in 1997 and led the team to a 13–5 record, but lost the East Final to the defending Grey Cup champion Toronto Argonauts. In 1998, the Alouettes finished with a 12–5–1 record, but lost the East Final on a last second field goal to the Hamilton Tiger-Cats.

Winnipeg Blue Bombers (II)
Ritchie was hired away from the Alouettes in 1999 because of a more lucrative offer from the Winnipeg Blue Bombers to become their head coach. The team had a 3–15 record the year before and Ritchie led the Blue Bombers to a 6–12 record in 1999. After an East Final appearance in 2000 with a 7–10–1 record, the Blue Bombers demonstrated dominance in 2001 with a 14–4 record, tied for the most wins in franchise history. However, the heavily favoured Blue Bombers were upset by the 8–10 Calgary Stampeders in the 89th Grey Cup game by a score of 27–19. Following the game, Ritchie was critical of placekicker, Troy Westwood, who missed three of four field goal attempts in the game.

Ritchie continued to field strong teams in the following seasons, with a 12–6 record in 2002 and an 11–7 record in 2003, but the team was defeated in the playoffs in both years with no Grey Cup appearances. On August 8, 2004, with the Blue Bombers losing three in a row with a 2–5 record to begin their season, Ritchie was relieved of head coaching duties. He finished his Blue Bomber tenure with the third-most wins in club history.

BC Lions (II)
Ritchie was hired by longtime associate, Wally Buono, on February 25, 2005, to become the defensive coordinator on the BC Lions in 2005. In 2006, he won his third Grey Cup championship as the Lions won the 94th Grey Cup over the Montreal Alouettes. After three seasons with the Lions, Ritchie retired following the end of the 2007 CFL season. He was considered for the 2008 Saskatchewan Roughriders head coach position, which he would have accepted, but the position went to Ken Miller.

Zurich Renegades
Richie returned to the field in 2011 as head coach of the Zurich Renegades in the top level league in Switzerland Nationalliga A (American football), helping the team reach the semi-finals in 2012. He spent two seasons with the team before returning to the United States.

Hall of Fame
Ritchie was named to the Fairmont State Hall of Fame in 2010, following five years as a head coach there with two conference titles and one Coal Bowl victory in 1979. He is a member of the Blue Bomber Hall of Fame as the fourth-winningest head coach in team history with a record of 52–44–1 and winning a Grey Cup as an assistant coach in 1990.

On June 21, 2022, it was announced that Ritchie would be enshrined in the Canadian Football Hall of Fame in the Class of 2022 as a builder.

CFL coaching record

Personal life
Ritchie and his wife, Sharon, live in Rhode Island, as of 2022. They have three children, Phyllis, Susan, and Dave, and eight grandchildren.

References

1938 births
Living people
BC Lions coaches
American expatriate sportspeople in Switzerland
American expatriate sportspeople in Italy
American expatriate players of American football
Fairmont State Fighting Falcons football coaches
Montreal Alouettes coaches
Ottawa Rough Riders coaches
Winnipeg Blue Bombers coaches
Winnipeg Blue Bombers general managers
Sportspeople from New Bedford, Massachusetts
BC Lions general managers